This is a list of the fifty most populous metropolitan areas in the Americas as of 2022, the most recent year for which official census results, estimates or projections are available for every major metropolitan area in the Americas. Where available, it uses official definitions of metropolitan areas based on the concept of a single urban core and its immediate surroundings, as opposed to polycentric conurbations. Figures refer to mid-2022 populations except in the case of Mexican metropolitan areas, whose figures derive from the 2022 Intercensal Survey conducted by INEGI with a reference date of 27 January 2022.

List

Gallery

Notes

References

Metropolitan areas
Americas
Metropolitan areas